Solomon is a common given name and surname derived from Aramaic; Sol as a given name is usually a form of "Solomon". Its Aramaic form,  is related to the Hebrew word shalom ("peace"); and is often chosen in part as a reference to King Solomon mentioned in the Hebrew Bible. The Arabic name , Sulaiman or Sulayman is regarded as equivalent to Solomon, and the Islamic prophet Suleiman and King Solomon are generally regarded as accounts of the same person.

Solomon is also ancient Koine Greek name, derived from 3rd century B.C.E. Septuagint translation of the Hebrew name  (Shelomoh).

Single name
 Solomon (exilarch), ruled the Diaspora Jewish community 730–761
 Solomon (magister militum) (480s/490s–544), Byzantine eunuch general, governor of Africa
 Solomon, Count of Cerdanya and Urgell (died c. 869)
 Solomon of Hungary (1053–1087)
 Solomon I of Imereti (1735–1784)
 Solomon II of Imereti (1772–1815)
 Solomon of Montpellier, a 13th-century Rabbi
 Solomon (pianist) (1902–1988), the professional name of the British pianist Solomon Cutner
 Solomon (rapper) (born 1991) American electronic hip-pop recording artist

Given name
 Solomon Alabi, (born 1988), Nigerian Basketball player
 Solomon Dias Bandaranaika (1862-1946), Sri Lankan Maha Mudaliyar
 Solomon West Ridgeway Dias Bandaranaika (1899-1959), Prime Minister of Sri Lanka from 1956 to 1959
 Solomon Brannan (born 1942), American football player
 Solomon Busendich (born 1984) Kenyan long-distance runner
 Solomon Burke (1940–2010) American recording artist
 Solomon S. Calhoon (1838–1908), justice of the Supreme Court of Mississippi
 Solomon Elimimian (born 1986), American football player
 Solomon Ferris (c.1748-1803), British naval officer
 Solomon kaDinuzulu (1891–1933) king of the Zulu nation from 1913 until 1933
 Solomon Kindley (born 1997), American football player
 Sol Lesser (1890–1980), film producer
 Solomon Luna (1858-1912), American rancher and banker.
 Solomon Machover (1906-1976), American psychologist
 Solomon P. McCurdy (1820–1890), justice of the Supreme Court of the Utah Territory
 Solomon Northup (1808-c.1863), free black man kidnapped into slavery
 Solomon Christoffel Obeyesekere (1848-1927), Sri Lankan Sinhala lawyer and legislator
 Park Solomon (born 1999), stage name Lomon, Uzbek-born South Korean actor.
 Solomon Shereshevsky (1886 – 1958), Russian journalist and mnemonist
 Sol Stern (born 1935), senior fellow at the Manhattan Institute
 Solomon Sufrin (1881–1931), New York assemblyman
 Solomon Thomas (born 1995), American football player
 Solomon Trujillo (born 1951) American businessman
 Sol Wachtler (born 1930), former Chief Judge of the New York Court of Appeals

Surname
Abraham Solomon (1823–1862), British painter
Albert Solomon (1876–1914), Australian politician, premier of Tasmania
Anthony M. Solomon (1919–2008), American Treasury undersecretary and president of the Federal Reserve Board of New York
Anu Solomon (born 1996), American football player
Barbara Probst Solomon (1928–2019), American author and journalist
Charles "King" Solomon (1884-1933), Russian-born mob boss of Boston
Charles J. Solomon (1906–1975), American bridge player
Clinton Solomon (born 1983), American football player
Daisy Solomon (1882 - 1978) South African / British suffragette
David Solomon (disambiguation), several people
Dean Solomon (born 1980), Australian footballer
Duane Solomon (born 1984), American middle distance runner
Edward I. Solomon (born 1946), Stanford University chemistry professor
Emanuel Solomon (1800–1875), pioneer of South Australia
Frances-Anne Solomon (born 1966), English-Caribbean-Canadian filmmaker, writer, producer, and distributor
Francis Darwin Solomon (1937–1998), American actor, professionally known as Darwin Joston
Freddie Solomon (1953–2012), American football player
Georgiana Solomon (1844 –1933) Scottish / South African educator and suffragette
George Solomon, (born c.1940) American sportswriter
Gerald Solomon (1930–2001), American politician
Grant Solomon (born 1995), American tennis player
Gustave Solomon (1930–1996), American mathematician and engineer
Harold Solomon (born 1952), American tennis player
Haym Solomon (1740–1785), financier of the U.S. in the Revolutionary War
Ikey Solomon (1785–1850), English criminal
Jacques Solomon (1908–1942), French physicist and Marxist
Jared Solomon (disambiguation), several people
Jesse Solomon, American football player
Jewel Solomon, American tech entrepreneur and venture capitalist
Jimmie Lee Solomon (1956-2020), American lawyer and Major League Baseball executive
Joe Solomon, West Indian cricketer
John R. Solomon (1910–1985), Canadian politician
Josh Solomon, guitar player and lead singer of the band Josh and the Empty Pockets
Karl Solomon (born 1994), Caymanian footballer
Kimberley Solomon, birth name of Kimberly Quinn (born 1961), American journalist, commentator, and magazine publisher
Lawrence Solomon, columnist
Linda Solomon, music critic
Malia Solomon (1915–2005), American artist
Manor Solomon (born 1999), Israeli international association footballer
Martin K. Solomon, mathematician
Martin M. Solomon (born 1950), American politician, New York state senator and Supreme Court judge
Maynard Solomon, American psychologist, music producer, and writer
Morris Solomon, Jr., serial killer
Mose Solomon (1900–1966), rabbi and baseball player
Norman Solomon, author and media critic
Peggy Solomon (1909–1995), American bridge player
Peter Solomon (disambiguation), several people
Reanna Solomon (1981–2022), Nauruan Olympic weightlifter
Richard Solomon (disambiguation), several people
Rivers Solomon, American science fiction author
Robert Solomon (disambiguation), several people
Rosalind Fox Solomon (born 1930), American photographer
Russ Solomon, founder of Tower Records
Samuel Moss Solomon (1769–1842), early settler in Australia, many notable descendants
Saul Solomon (disambiguation), several people
Shalonda Solomon American sprinter
Sheldon Solomon, co-developer of terror management theory
Shirley Solomon, Canadian television talk show host
Simeon Solomon, British Pre-Raphaelite painter
Solomon family, historically notable family in Australian politics and business
Solomon Joseph Solomon, British Pre-Raphaelite painter
Stacey Solomon (born 1989) British singer, television presenter, and model
Steven Solomon (born 1993), Australian Olympic sprinter
Suniti Solomon (1938 or 1939–2015), Indian physician and microbiologist
Susan Solomon (born 1956), atmospheric chemist, MIT faculty
Vaiben Louis Solomon (1853–1908) first mayor of Darwin and 21st premier of South Australia
Vonzell Solomon, American singer
 Will Solomon (born 1978), American basketball player
William Ewart Gladstone Solomon, British artist, and educator, principal of Bombay School of Art
Willie Solomon, basketball player

Fictional characters
 Alfie Solomons is a fictional character played by Tom Hardy in the British period crime drama Peaky Blinders
Dick Solomon, lead character of the television sitcom '3rd Rock from the Sun'
 Sally Solomon, character in the television sitcom '3rd Rock from the Sun'
Solomon Kane, lead character in some of Robert E. Howard short stories.
 Harry Solomon, character in the television sitcom '3rd Rock from the Sun'
 Tommy Solomon, character in the television sitcom '3rd Rock from the Sun'
 Peter Solomon, character in Dan Brown's The Lost Symbol
 Katherine Solomon, character in Dan Brown's The Lost Symbol
 Solomon Grundy, villain character from DC Comics comic books and TV series
 Solomon Lane, villain character in the Mission: Impossible film series.

See also
 Solomon (disambiguation)
 Solomons (disambiguation)
Salomon, surname
Salamon, surname
Salmon, surname
Salman, name and surname
 Sol (given name)

References

English masculine given names
Aramaic-language names